The Général-Jean-Victor-Allard Building (also known as the "Megaplex" or "Mega") is part of the 2nd Division Support Group Saint-Jean Garrison in Saint-Jean-sur-Richelieu, Quebec. It hosts the Canadian Forces Leadership and Recruit School, which is the main location for basic recruit and officer training for the CAF. It is composed of three sectors: Orange, used as the main working body of the building; Green Sector, used as residence to house the Non-Commissioned Member Recruits and Blue Sector, which houses the Officer Cadets. Other notable areas inside of the Mega include the O'Mega Mess (the Junior Ranks Mess and popular after hours area for recruits), the Patriot Club (Senior NCO and Officer's Mess). 

The building is named for General Jean Victor Allard, the first French-Canadian to become a Chief of the Defence Staff, the highest position in the Canadian Forces. He was also the first to hold the accompanying rank of (full, four-leaf) general.

References

Buildings and structures in Saint-Jean-sur-Richelieu